Solar collector may refer to:

 Solar thermal collector, a solar collector that collects heat by absorbing sunlight
 Solar Collector (sculpture), a 2008 interactive light art installation in Cambridge, Ontario, Canada

See also
Concentrating solar power
Renewable heat
Solar air heating
Solar water heating
Solar panel